Eugen Pojoni (also known as Jenő Pozsonyi; born 1 January 1942) is a Romanian former football defender. He was part of UTA's team that in the 1970–1971 European Cup season eliminated Feyenoord who were European champions at that time.

Honours
Crișul Oradea
Divizia B: 1962–63
UTA Arad
Divizia A: 1968–69, 1969–70

Notes

References

External links

Eugen Pojoni at Labtof.ro

1942 births
Living people
Romanian footballers
Association football defenders
Liga I players
Liga II players
FC Bihor Oradea players
FC UTA Arad players